Letting in the Sunshine is a 1933 British comedy crime film directed by Lupino Lane and starring Albert Burdon, Renee Gadd and Molly Lamont. It was based on a story by Anthony Asquith. The film was made by British International Pictures at Elstree Studios. The sets were designed by the art director David Rawnsley. The theme song "Letting in the Sunshine" was written by the composer Noel Gay.

Synopsis
A window cleaner and his housemaid girlfriend try to thwart a gang's plan to steal a valuable necklace during a society dance.

Cast
 Albert Burdon as Nobby Green
 Renee Gadd as Jane
 Molly Lamont as Lady Anne
 Henry Mollison as Duvine
 Herbert Langley as Foreman
 Eric Le Fre as Bill
 Ethel Warwick as Housekeeper
 Syd Crossley as Jenkyns
 Toni Edgar-Bruce as Lady Warminster

References

Bibliography
 Sutton, David R. A chorus of raspberries: British film comedy 1929-1939. University of Exeter Press, 2000.

External links

1933 films
Films shot at British International Pictures Studios
Films directed by Lupino Lane
British crime comedy films
Films set in London
British black-and-white films
1930s crime comedy films
1933 comedy films
1930s English-language films
1930s British films